The Taft Homes are a public housing project located off the Illinois River in Peoria, Illinois. In total there are 200 apartments in Taft, housed in separate wood-framed buildings. The Taft Homes are currently in the early stages of a redevelopment project that calls for the demolition of all current units, with the lots then transformed into mixed-income housing.

History
The Taft Homes were originally built in 1952 as a temporary means of shelter for veterans returning from the Korean War. The buildings soon transitioned to low income housing and during the 1960s and 70s the housing project saw multiple violent riots. In 1968 ten police officers and a reporter were wounded after a minor incident turned into a race riot that lasted for around 3 hours. A second major race riot occurred in 1970 after the police evicted two female residents from the Taft Homes; resulting in rioting that spread throughout other public housing projects in the city. In 1996 all 220 units in the complex underwent comprehensive rehabilitation efforts by the city; the units received new siding, flooring and plumbing in order to make the buildings more energy efficient. The renovation efforts also added, and updated parking, lighting, sidewalks as well as various landscaping work. Durings its modernization effort the Housing Authority decided to demolish the 15 buildings closest to the river, that were known for illicit activities. The United States Marine Corps, U.S. Navy Seabees and Illinois Air National Guard helped in the demolition effort.

Redevelopment plan
Following the rehabilitation project of 1996 Peoria Public Housing decided to pursue a redevelopment of the units. The plan calls for a mixed income neighborhood, that could include some market rate homes, along the desirable Illinois River. The first development would begin along the shoreline, an area left vacant by the demolition of the 15 original buildings located at the site. Demolition of the current buildings would begin after the current residents find alternate housing options.

References

Residential buildings completed in 1952
Public housing in the United States
Buildings and structures in Peoria, Illinois